The West Highland White Terrier, commonly known as the Westie, is a breed of dog from Scotland with a distinctive white harsh coat with a somewhat soft white undercoat. It is a medium-sized terrier, although with longer legs than other Scottish breeds of terrier. It has a white double coat of fur which fills out the dog's face, giving it a rounded appearance.

The breed is intelligent, quick to learn, and can be good with children, but does not always tolerate rough handling. The Westie is an active breed, and is social with a high prey drive, as they were once used to hunt rodents.

The modern breed is descended from a number of breeding programmes of white terriers in Scotland before the 20th century. Cousin to the Cairn Terrier, the Westie was bred to hunt small rodents at places such as farms. Edward Donald Malcolm, 16th Laird of Poltalloch, is credited with the creation of the modern breed from his Poltalloch Terrier, but did not want to be known as such.

Other related breeds included George Campbell, 8th Duke of Argyll's Roseneath Terrier and Dr Americ Edwin Flaxman's Pittenweem Terriers. This breed of small white Scottish terriers was given its modern name for the first time in 1908, with recognition by major kennel clubs occurring around the same time.

The breed remains very popular in the UK, with multiple wins at Cruft's. It has been in the top third of all breeds in the US since the 1960s. It has been featured in television and film, including in Hamish Macbeth, and in advertising by companies such as Cesar dog food and the Scotch whisky Black & White.

Several breed-specific and non-specific health problems appear in the breed, including a condition in young dogs nicknamed "westie jaw" which causes an overgrowth of bone in the jaw of the dog. It can also be prone to skin disorders, with a breed-specific condition called hyperplastic dermatosis occurring. They are a very energetic and boisterous breed, needing regular exercise of around one hour per day.

Appearance

Commonly, Westies have bright, deep-set, almond-shaped eyes that are dark in colour. Their ears are pointed and erect. The body should be shorter than the height of the dog at the shoulder.

They also have a deep chest, muscular limbs, a black nose, and a short, closely fitted jaw with "scissors" bite (lower canines locked in front of upper canines, upper incisors locked over lower incisors). The Westie's paws are slightly turned out to give it better grip than flat-footed breeds when it climbs on rocky surfaces. In young puppies, the nose and footpads have pink markings, which slowly turn black as they age. Westies also have short and sturdy tails. Some sources suggest that due to their history as rodent catchers, their tails were bred to be thick so that a Westie trapped in a hole could be easily pulled out by the tail.

The fur fills out the face to give a rounded appearance. As puppies develop into adults, their coarse outer coat is normally removed by either "hand-stripping", especially for dog-showing, or otherwise clipping. Most Westies are pure white, although there are some light wheaten colour variations.

Temperament

The temperament of the West Highland White Terrier can vary greatly, with some being friendly towards children, while others prefer solitude. It will not typically tolerate rough handling, such as a child pulling on its ears or fur, and can frequently be both food- and toy-possessive. This makes regular training from a young age of particular importance. It is normally independent, assured, and self-confident, and can make a good watchdog. It is a loyal breed that bonds with its owner but is often on the move, requiring daily exercise (15–30 min though ideally, at least an hour). The Westie is highly social and is the most friendly and jolly of all the Scottish breeds of terriers.

It is a hardy breed, and can be stubborn, leading to issues with training. A Westie may need to have its training refreshed on occasion during its lifetime. Having a typical terrier prey drive, it tends to be highly interested in toys, especially chasing balls. It does retain the instincts of an earth-dog, including inquisitive and investigative traits, as well as natural instincts to bark and dig holes. It is ranked in the average range as 88th in Stanley Coren's The Intelligence of Dogs.

Health

The American breed club puts the lifespan of the Westie at 12 to 16 years. A club survey puts the average lifespan at 11.4 years. Veterinary clinic data from the UK show a typical lifespan of 10.5 to 15 years. The French Kennel Club database gives 8 to 16 years, with a median of 13 years. The typical litter size is between three and five puppies.

The breed is pre-disposed to conditions found in many breeds, such as abdominal hernias. Westie puppies may be affected by craniomandibular osteopathy, a disease also known as "lion jaw", and is sometimes also referred to as "westie jaw". The disease is an autosomal recessive condition, so a puppy can only be affected by it if both of its parents are carriers of the faulty gene. The condition appears across many breeds, including several different types of terriers, as well as other unrelated breeds such as the Great Dane. It typically appears in dogs under a year old, and can cause problems for the dog to chew or swallow food. Radiographic testing can be conducted to diagnose the condition, in which the bones around the jaw thicken; additionally, the blood may show increased calcium levels and enzyme levels. The condition often stops progressing by the time the dog is a year old, and in some cases can recede. It is normally treated with anti-inflammatory medications, and the feeding of soft foods. In some cases, tube feeding may be necessary.

The breed is prone to skin disorders. About a quarter of Westies surveyed are affected by atopic dermatitis, a heritable chronic allergic skin condition. A higher proportion of males are affected compared to females. An uncommon but severe breed-specific skin condition, hyperplastic dermatosis, may affect West Highland White Terriers, both juveniles and adults dogs. Affected dogs can suffer from red hyperpigmentation, lichenification, and hair loss. In the initial stages, this condition can be misdiagnosed as allergies or less serious forms of dermatitis.

An inherited genetic problem that exists in the breed is globoid cell leukodystrophy. It is not breed-specific, and can appear in Cairn Terriers and other breeds including Beagles and Pomeranians. It is a neurological disease wherein the dog lacks the enzyme galactosylceramidase. The symptoms are noticeable as the puppy develops, and can be identified by the age of 30 weeks. Affected dogs have tremors, muscle weakness, and trouble walking. Symptoms slowly increase until limb paralysis begins to occur. Due to it being a hereditary condition, owners should avoid breeding affected animals to eliminate it from the breed. Another genetic condition that affects the breed is "white dog shaker syndrome". As this condition is most commonly found in Westies and Maltese, the condition was originally thought to be connected to the genes for white coats, but the same condition has since been found in other non-white breeds including the Yorkshire Terrier and the Dachshund. The condition typically develops over one to three days, resulting in tremors of the head and limbs, ataxia, and hypermetria. Affected males and females can be affected for different lengths of time, with symptoms in females lasting between four and six weeks, while males can be affected the rest of their lives.

Other less common conditions which appear in the breed include hydroxyglutaric aciduria, which is where elevated levels of Alpha-Hydroxyglutaric acid are in the dog's urine, blood plasma, and spinal fluid. It can cause seizures, muscle stiffness, and ataxia, but is more commonly found in Staffordshire Bull Terriers. A degeneration of the hip joint, known as Legg–Calvé–Perthes syndrome, also occurs in the breed. However, the chances of this condition occurring are much higher in some other breeds, such as the Australian Shepherd and the Miniature Pincher. The breed is also one of the least likely to be affected by a luxating patella, where the knee cap slips out of place.

History

Scottish white terriers were recorded as early as during the reign of James VI of Scotland, who reigned between 1567 and 1625. The king ordered that a dozen of these white terriers be procured from Argyll to be presented to the Kingdom of France as a gift. Sandy- and brindle-coloured dogs were seen as hardier than those of other colours, and white dogs were seen as being weak. At various times during the breed's existence, it has been considered a white offshoot of both the Scottish Terrier and the Cairn Terrier breeds.

Reports of a ship from the Spanish Armada being wrecked on the island of Skye in 1588 indicated the ship carried white Spanish dogs, whose descendants were kept distinct from other breeds by Clan Donald, including the families of the Chiefs. Other families on Skye preserved both white and sandy-coloured dogs. One such family was the Clan MacLeod, and it was reported by their descendants that at least two Chiefs kept white terriers, including "The Wicked Man" Norman MacLeod, and his grandson Norman, who became Chief after his death.

George Campbell, 8th Duke of Argyll, chief of Clan Campbell, bred a breed of white Scottish terriers known as the "Roseneath Terrier". Another breed of white Scottish terriers also appeared at this point, with Dr. Americ Edwin Flaxman from Fife developing his line of "Pittenweem Terriers" out of a female Scottish Terrier which produced white offspring. The dog seemed to produce these white puppies regardless of the sire to which she was bred, and after drowning over 20 of these offspring, he came upon the theory that it was an ancient trait of the Scottish Terrier that was trying to reappear. He re-dedicated his breeding programme to produce white Scottish Terriers with the aim of restoring it to the same stature as the dark-coloured breed. Flaxman is credited with classes being added to dog shows for white Scottish Terriers towards the end of the 19th century.

The person most closely associated with developing the modern breed of West Highland White Terrier is Edward Donald Malcolm, 16th Laird of Poltalloch. Malcolm owned terriers used to work game; the story told is that a reddish-brown terrier was mistaken for a fox and shot. Following this, Malcolm decided to develop a white terrier breed, which became known as the "Poltalloch Terrier". The first generation of Poltallochs had sandy-coloured coats, and had already developed prick ears, which is a trait seen later in the modern breed. It is unknown if the Poltalloch Terriers and Pittenweem Terriers were interbred. In 1903, Malcolm declared that he did not want to be known as the creator of the breed and insisted that his breed of white terriers be renamed. The term "West Highland White Terrier" first appears in Otters and Otter Hunting by L.C.R. Cameron, published in 1908.

The first breed club was set up in 1904; Niall Campbell, 10th Duke of Argyll, was the society's first president. A second club was subsequently set up, with the Countess of Aberdeen as chairman. Edward Malcolm succeeded the Countess as the club's second chairman. Kennel Club recognition followed in 1907, and the breed appeared at Crufts for the first time in the same year. The Westie was imported into the United States in 1907–1908, when Robert Goelet imported Ch. Kiltie and Ch. Rumpus Glenmohr. Initially, it was also known at the time as the Roseneath Terrier, and the Roseneath Terrier Club was recognised by the American Kennel Club in 1908. The club was renamed during the following year to the West Highland White Terrier Club of America. The breed spent the period that immediately followed as being "in vogue", becoming popular almost immediately upon its arrival in the US. Canadian Kennel Club recognition followed in 1909. Until 1924 in the UK, Westie pedigrees were allowed to have Cairn and Scottish Terriers in them. By the time of Malcolm's death in 1930, a stable type had appeared with prick ears, a white coat, and a short back.

In major conformation shows, the breed has been equally successful on both sides of the Atlantic. The first member of the breed to win a show championship was Ch. Morvan in 1905, owned by Colin Young. The dog was registered at the time as a Scottish Terrier, and won the title at the Scottish Kennel Club show at the age of seven months. Because the breed was not yet recognised independently, the championship title was not retained when the dog was reregistered as a West Highland White Terrier. The first win at a major show came at the Westminster Kennel Club Dog Show in 1942 when Constance Winant's Ch. Wolvey Pattern of Edgerstoune won the title of Best in Show. The same title was taken by Barbara Worcester's Ch. Elfinbrook Simon in 1962. It took a further 14 years before the breed took its first Best in Show title at Crufts, the UK's major dog show. Ch. Dianthus Buttons, owned by Kath Newstead and Dorothy Taylor, took the title for the breed in 1976. A Westie also won Crufts in 1990 with the Best in Show title going to Derek Tattersall's Ch. Olac Moon Pilot, and in 2016 to Burneze Geordie Girl.

The popularity of the breed during the early 20th century was such that dogs were being exchanged for hundreds of guineas. As of 2010, the Westie is the third-most popular breed of terrier in the UK, with 5,361 puppies registered with the Kennel Club. However, this is a decrease in numbers since 2001, when it was the most popular terrier breed, with 11,019 new dogs registered. The breed's position in the United States is more stable with it remaining in the top third of all breeds since around 1960. It was ranked 30th-most popular in 2001, based on registrations with the American Kennel Club, which varied around the 30s in the decade after, with it ranked 34th in 2010. It was the 44th-most popular AKC breed in 2020.

In popular culture

In public life
 Muhammad Ali Jinnah, founder of Pakistan, owned a Westie.
 J. K. Rowling, author of the Harry Potter series, has a Westie named Brontë.
Lieutenant Governor of British Columbia Janet Austin owns a Westie named MacDuff, who affectionately holds the title of Vice-Regal Canine Consort.

In branding
 Black & White whisky has used both Scottish Terriers and Westies as its mascots.
 The breed is used as the mascot of the dog food brand Cesar.
 The Australian dog food manufacturer Mars Incorporated uses the West Highland White Terrier breed as the face of their My Dog brand. The Westie can be seen on My Dog packaging, website, and television and print advertisements.
British luxury department store, Harrods, uses the West Highland White Terrier as a mascot.

In film
 The film The Adventures of Greyfriars Bobby, released in the UK in February 2006, cast a West Highland White Terrier as Bobby. The appearance of a Westie caused protests from the Skye Terrier breed club, which complained about the filmmaker's use of an incorrect dog breed for the part.
 In the film Lethal Weapon 3, Carrie Murtaugh, played by Ebonie Smith, carried a Westie early in the movie when Martin Riggs (played by Mel Gibson) brings his laundry to the Murtaugh home.
 The 2018 film Game Night prominently features a West Highland Terrier.
 The 2018 film Widows features the same West Highland Terrier as in Game Night.

In television
 The titular character in the BBC Scotland–produced television series Hamish Macbeth owned a Westie named "Wee Jock". This dog later dies and is replaced by another Westie named Jock.
 In the Brazilian television animated series As Aventuras de Gui & Estopa (The Adventures of Gui & Estopa), the main character Gui is the Terrier breed.
 In the TV show Jeeves and Wooster, Bertie's Aunt Agatha owns an Aberdeen Terrier named McIntosh. However, in Season 1, episodes 1 and 2, Mcintosh was actually played by a white Westie. Episode 2 is based on the short story "Episode of the Dog McIntosh" from the book Very Good, Jeeves.
 King of the Hill features a West Highland White Terrier, Doggie, owned by the main character's neighbour, Kahn Souphanousinphone.
 PAW Patrol features a West Highland White Terrier named Sweetie, owned by the Princess of Barkingburg.

In literature
 The McDuff series of children's books written by American author Rosemary Wells and illustrated by Susan Jeffers follows the adventures of the eponymous Westie, McDuff.

See also
 Dogs portal

References

Notes

Bibliography

FCI breeds
Terriers
Dog breeds originating in Scotland